Anti-magnetic seal (from ) or anti-magnetic sticker, indicator of the  magnetic field is a device that serves to indicate the influence of magnetic fields on the protected object and helps to reduce theft of energy (electricity, water, gas, heat, fuel).

General description
There are various ways of fastening magnetically sensitive seals to the water meter. One option is a sticker which is based on a special sealing duct tape. It is equipped with a sealed capsule, where there is the element sensitive to the magnetic field (suspension, rare-earth metals). Microscopic particles contained in the suspension are sensitive to magnetic fields. They inform about the impact of magnet to the counter, that control energy consumption by changing its original state and spread inside the capsule or change the picture. The indicator seal is mounted by sticking to the count’s hull. An individual number provides protection against counterfeits. It is applied using a laser or printing method.

Differences
Anti-magnetic seals are distinguished by way of indication the magnetic influence (depending on the production technology), sensitivity to different strength of magnetic fields (measured in militesla), the capsule design and protection from exposure to it, stickers size and color, method of applying a unique number of the temperature operation mode.

Additional information
Indication’s technologies can be protected by patents , depending on the manufacturer. The demand for anti-magnetic seals increases every year. This effect is caused by the rise in energy and the ability to purchase neodymium magnets. The indicator are pasted near the possible impact of the magnet.

External links
Video indication impact on seal
Visual images
Patent

Seals (mechanical)